Hugh Franklin may refer to:

Hugh Franklin (actor) (1916–1986), American actor
Hugh Franklin (suffragist) (1889–1962), British political activist

See also